Suchitra Junction or Suchitra Center or Suchitra cross roads is a suburb of Hyderabad, Telangana, India, on the Bowenpally-Medchal Road.

History
There was an electronic component unit by name Suchitra Electronics Ltd. at Suchitra Junction from 1981 to 2000. This company was promoted by Krishnam Raju. They were employing over 1500 employees here when there was not even a bus service to this area. This was a major establishment in those days. Hence it came to be known as Suchitra Junction. At the same premises Suchitra Academy (CBSE School) has been set up.

The proposal, which recently got a nod from the State Government looks to expand the MMTS in different directions. Presently, the service is run between Lingampally-Nampally, Lingampally-Falaknuma and Falaknuma-Nampally. The proposal is to spread its reach to Shamshabad, Ghatkesar, Medchal and Patancheru.

It has also been decided to revive certain sections like Moulali-Sanathnagar which are presently catering to the goods service. Once done, this line will have the MMTS serving residents of Ferozeguda, Bowenpally, Venkatapuram, Bhudevi 4colNagar, Lothukunta, Neredmet, East Anand Bagh and Moulali. Introducing the service on Secunderabad-Ghatkesar route will mean the entire 19 km stretch getting a swank and quick transport system. As of now, this line has stations at Lallaguda, Lalapet, Moulali, Cherlapalli and the Singapore Township while some new ones are to be identified on the route.

Along Malkajgiri, Dayanand Nagar, Safilguda, R.K.Puram,Bowenpally, Ammuguda, Cavalry Barracks, Alwal, Bolarum Bazaar, Gundla Pochampalli and Gowdavalli the MMTS will touch these spots while racing towards Medchal. The Secunderabad-Medchal line is expected to be around 28 km long. On the busy Patancheru sector, the service which presently terminates at Lingampally gets extended till the bustling industrial estate with new stations identified at Tellapur, BHEL, Ashoknagar and Patancheru.

In fact, the transit-oriented development (TOD) concept suggests the growth of a city along rail corridors or along roads which are very wide, says the MMTS Project Director, N.V.S.Reddy.

Like the Outer Ring Road (ORR), the MMTS expansion project too is likely to spur interest of those looking to invest in property. Realtors have already been rushing to the proposed ORR sites for layouts even while the administration is giving a serious consideration to set up quite a few satellite townships alongside the ORR. And the same is expected to happen as the MMTS expands, taking new areas into its fold. Real estate watchers say the stretches getting connected with a faster, efficient, affordable and pollution free MMTS service will soon witness a new buzz. "The MMTS phase-I mainly catered to the city which is already choking. The second phase servicing suburbs like Medchal, Ghatkesar and Shamshabad is bound to increase property values," says a realtor. When completed, the second phase of MMTS along with the first phase is expected to bring the service within 1 km reach for 31 per cent of the population and within 4 km reach for 78 per cent population. Since it criss-crosses the city core and also the outskirts, the two phases will have 38 per cent employment centres within 1 km reach and 84 per cent of them within a 4 km radius.

Colonies in Suchitra Center
BHEL Avemachs,Boudha nagar colony, Praga Tools Colony, Subhash Nagar, Sri Durga Estates, Raghavendra Colony, Gayatri Nagar, Bank Colony, MNReddy Nagar, Ramaraj Nagar,Jayaram Nagar, Venkateshwara Colony, New Manikyanagar, Bhagyalaxmi Colony, Godavari Homes, Shantha sriram satellite township, laxmi ganga enclave, Spring Fields Colony, Sri Nilaya Enclave.

Basic Amenities
Suchitra Center got many amenities like good schools, banks, hospitals, supermarkets, restaurants like My Friend Circle, Bommarillu, Kritunga, Swagath Grand, Surabhi Pride, Subway, KFC, Pizza Hut, Mc Donalds, KLM Shopping Mall, RS Brothers, Mafti, Priyadharshini restaurant and Karachi Bakery were established and electronic showrooms like Istation (Apples authorized dealer), Reliance digital, Samsung, Max, Yesmart, Bajaj Electronics, Metro Supermarket, Chennai Shopping Mall, Pai international and many more already established and many showrooms were expected....

TNR NorthCity Mall, a shopping mall which is under construction by TNR Estates will have Cinepolis multiplex with 6 screens, food courts, 75+ retail stores and hyper market on a 6.3 Lakh square foot area including parking.

External links
  Suchitra-Junction (Center) on the NH7 On Wikimapia

 

Neighbourhoods in Hyderabad, India